Giampietro Silvio or Giampietro di Marco di Francesco Silvio (1495 – 1552) was an Italian painter.

Silvio was born in Venice and though it hasn't been proven that he was a pupil, he was familiar with the studio of Titian because his paintings  are in his style. He is known for portraits and wall decorations, most notably the cycle of paintings on the presentation of Mary in the Sala dell'Albergo in the Gallerie dell'Accademia which he created alongside Titian.

Silvio died in Venice.

References

1495 births
1552 deaths
16th-century Italian painters
Painters from Venice
Italian Renaissance painters